Dieida ahngeri is a moth in the family Cossidae. It was described by Grigory Grum-Grshimailo in 1902. It is found in Transcaspia, where it has been recorded from Turkmenistan, Uzbekistan and Tajikistan.

References

Cossinae
Moths described in 1902
Moths of Asia